Melanie Merkosky (born April 7, 1986) is a Canadian actress. She played Jennie in the Internet series lonelygirl15.

Career
Merkosky had parts on Runaway, Slings and Arrows, and American Pie Presents The Naked Mile.  In 2009, she starred as Robin Matthews on the web series Harper's Globe, which was an online companion to TV series Harper's Island.

Filmography
 1998: Noah as Cheerleader #1
 1998: Honey, I Shrunk the Kids: The TV Show as Girl (1 episode)
 1999: The Sheldon Kennedy Story as Theresa
 2002: Door to Door as Diner Teenage Girl (as Melanie Merkovsky)
 2006: American Pie Presents The Naked Mile as Natalie
 2006: Away from Her as Singing Nurse
 2006: Slings and Arrows as Megan (5 episodes)
 2006 - 2008: Runaway as Sam (9 episodes)
 2007: The Poet as Olga
 2007: Til Death Do Us Part as Tara Clark (1 episode)
 2007 - 2008: lonelygirl15 as Jennie (34 episodes)
 2009: Harper's Globe as Robin Matthews (16 episodes -  web series)
 2009: Harper's Island as Robin Matthews (1 episode)
 2009: H and G as G (also writer and producer)
 2012-2013: Continuum
 2014: The Strain as Sylvia Kent (recurring role)
 2014: An Eye for Beauty as Lindsay
 2015: Saving Hope (Season 3, Episode 13)

References

External links

Living people
Canadian web series actresses
Canadian television actresses
Canadian film actresses
1986 births
Canadian film producers
Canadian women screenwriters
Video bloggers
Women video bloggers
20th-century Canadian actresses
21st-century Canadian actresses
Canadian child actresses
Canadian women bloggers
Canadian bloggers
Canadian women film producers
21st-century Swedish women writers
Canadian women film directors
Swedish bloggers
Swedish women bloggers
21st-century Canadian screenwriters
20th-century Swedish women